David Registe (born 2 May 1988) is a US-born athlete representing Dominica in the long jump. He won the silver at the 2011 Pan American Games. Registe has a dual citizenship with the United States. His Dominica-born parents emigrated to Alaska in 1976.

His personal best in the long jump is 8.29 metres, set at Azusa Pacific University in 2015 winning the Brian Clay Invitational.

Competition record

Personal bests
100 metres – 10.68 (+0.1 m/s) (Salem 2011)
200 metres – 21.44 (-1.0 m/s) (Walnut 2011)
Long jump – 8.29 (+3.0 m/s) (Azusa Pacific 2015)

References

1988 births
Living people
Sportspeople from Anchorage, Alaska
American people of Dominica descent
Dominica male long jumpers
Athletes (track and field) at the 2011 Pan American Games
Athletes (track and field) at the 2015 Pan American Games
Pan American Games silver medalists for Dominica
Pan American Games medalists in athletics (track and field)
Athletes (track and field) at the 2014 Commonwealth Games
Athletes (track and field) at the 2018 Commonwealth Games
Commonwealth Games competitors for Dominica
American male long jumpers
People from Palmer, Alaska
Central American and Caribbean Games gold medalists for Dominica
Competitors at the 2014 Central American and Caribbean Games
Central American and Caribbean Games medalists in athletics
Medalists at the 2011 Pan American Games